John Kelley Lovelace is an American songwriter known mainly for his work with country music artist Brad Paisley. He has written several of Paisley's singles, including the number 1 hits "He Didn't Have to Be" (Paisley's first number 1), "The World", "Ticks", "Online", "I'm Still a Guy", "Start a Band", "Water", and "Remind Me". He has also written Top 10 singles for Joe Nichols, Jason Aldean, Terri Clark, and Carrie Underwood. In 2010, he received an ASCAP award for "Water".

Lovelace is an alumnus of Hixson High School in Chattanooga, Tennessee and Belmont University in Nashville. Lovelace also played football for Hixson High.
John Kelley Lovelace is married to Rachel Kerr Lovelace and they live in Franklin, TN.

References

American country songwriters
American male songwriters
Belmont University alumni
Living people
Musicians from Paducah, Kentucky
Country musicians from Kentucky
Songwriters from Kentucky
Year of birth missing (living people)